Israel Casado, also known as Ysrael Casado, is a Dominican arranger, music coordinator, piano player, musical director, and producer. He is best known for working with artists Toño Rosario and Los Hermanos Rosario. Although he is no longer with Toño Rosario, he worked alongside Toño Rosario for over 13 years.

Israel Casado has also collaborated with Benny Sadel, Elvis Crespo, Grupo Mania, Manny Manuel, Vico C, and Miriam Cruz.

See also
Toño Rosario

Los Hermanos Rosario

References 

1. Cobo, Leila. “Music Billboard Picks.” Billboard, 8 Jan. 2005, p. 32.

2. Radano, Ronald, et al. “Dominicans in The Mix.” Reggaeton Refiguring American Music, Duke University Press, 2010, pp. 139–143.

External links 
 MSN Music Album Credits
 Toño Rosario Resistire Album Credits
 Grupo Mania The Dynasty Album Credits
 Featured Interview with Israel Casado

Merengue musicians
Year of birth missing (living people)
Living people
Dominican Republic pianists
21st-century pianists